Ali Al-Saadi (Arabic:علي السعدي) (born 15 July 1982) is an Emirati footballer. He currently plays as a defensive midfielder or defender.

Career
He formerly played for Al Dhafra, Al-Sharjah, Al-Fujairah, Ittihad Kalba, and Dibba Al-Fujairah.

References

External links
 

1982 births
Living people
Emirati footballers
Al Dhafra FC players
Sharjah FC players
Fujairah FC players
Al-Ittihad Kalba SC players
Dibba FC players
UAE Pro League players
UAE First Division League players
Association football midfielders
Association football defenders
Place of birth missing (living people)